Marie-Michèle Gagnon (born 25 April 1989) is a World Cup alpine ski racer from Canada. Born in Lévis, Quebec, she was a technical skier focused on slalom. However, since an injury at the start of 2017 season, she no longer competes in slalom and rarely in giant slalom, focusing on speed disciplines and combined.

Career
Gagnon joined the Canadian national team at the age of eighteen, although a leg fracture halted her progress at the start of her rookie season. She made her World Cup debut in December 2008 and has represented Canada at two Winter Olympics and six World Championships.

Gagnon's first World Cup podium came in March 2012, a third-place in a slalom at Åre, Sweden. Her first victory was in January 2014, a combined event at Altenmarkt, Austria. which was the first podium for a Canadian in a World Cup combined event in thirty years. The previous day she scored her first World Cup points in downhill at the same venue. That season she also took her first top ten World Cup finishes in super-G, finishing tenth and sixth in races in Lake Louise and St. Moritz respectively. At the Winter Olympics, Gagnon crashed out of the slalom run of the combined, dislocating her shoulder, before failing to finish the super-G and giant slalom, and securing a ninth place in the slalom. She finished thirteenth in the overall World Cup standings and sixth in slalom.

In January 2022, Gagnon was named to Canada's 2022 Olympic team.

Personal life
Gagnon was the third of five siblings and left the family home at age twelve to pursue her education and ski racing in Mont-Sainte-Anne and Quebec City. Her childhood idols included Mélanie Turgeon, Geneviève Simard, and Erik Guay.

Gagnon has been in a relationship with American alpine racer Travis Ganong since 2008. The pair met through mutual friend Louis-Pierre Hélie; in 2014, the couple moved to a new home in Lake Tahoe, California. They became engaged at the Matterhorn on 15 September 2021.

World Cup results

Season titles
 1 title (1 combined) 

Crystal globes in combined were not awarded during these seasons, but medals were.

Season standings

Race podiums
 2 wins – (2 SC)
 5 podiums – (2 SL, 2 SC, 1 SG); 61 top tens

World Championship results

Olympic results

References

External links

Alpine Canada.org – national ski team – athletes – Marie-Michèle Gagnon

1989 births
Canadian female alpine skiers
Alpine skiers at the 2010 Winter Olympics
Alpine skiers at the 2014 Winter Olympics
Alpine skiers at the 2022 Winter Olympics
Olympic alpine skiers of Canada
Sportspeople from Quebec
People from Lévis, Quebec
Living people